The MacDonalds of Ardnamurchan also known as MacIain of Ardnamurchan, or Clan MacIan, were a Scottish family and a branch of the larger Clan Donald.

History

Origins of the Clan

The founder of the Macdonalds of Ardnamurchan was Iain Sprangach MacDonald (d.1340), the third son of Angus Mor MacDonald (d.1292), 4th chief of Clan Donald. Iain is the Scottish Gaelic for the Christian name John. The surname MacIain therefore means son of John.

Iain Sprangach MacDonald was also known as John the Bold. His brother, Angus Og Macdonald, Lord of the Isles, was a great ally of King Robert the Bruce. Ian's early affiliations, like those of his family, were serving Edward I (until Robert Bruce became King of Scots). His grant of Ardnamurchan likely came from his brother, Angus Og, as it was one of the lands granted to Angus Og by Robert I. The MacDonalds of Ardnamurchan became known as the MacIains.

15th Century

Alexander MacDonald, the third chief of the MacIains is believed to have been killed during the Battle of Harlaw in 1411. Alexander's son John led the clan at the Battle of Inverlochy (1431). After this he was awarded lands on the isles of Islay and Jura.

The MacIains supported the MacDonald Lordship of the Isles until, in 1493, the fourth and last Lord of the Isles forfeited his title to King James IV. By 1494 the King had garrisoned and provisioned Dunaverty Castle. It is said that the MacDonalds led by Sir John MacDonald, who the king had recently knighted, retook the castle before the King had even departed to Stirling and that the dead body of the King's castle governor was hung over the castle walls in sight of the King and his departing entourage. Sir John Macdonald however was later captured by MacDonald (or MacIain) of Ardnamurchan. He was tried and hung on the Burgh Muir.

In 1497 Sir Alexander MacDonald of Lochalsh rebelled against the King and invaded the lands of Ross-shire where he was defeated at the Battle of Drumchatt by the Clan Mackenzie. Alexander MacDonald of Localsh escaped southwards amongst the Isles until he was caught on the Isle of Oronsay and put to death by MacIain of Ardnamurchan.

16th Century

In 1515 MacIain of Ardnamurchan's Mingarry Castle was besieged by the Clan MacDonald of Lochalsh and again two years later when they finally took the castle.

Other treacherous deeds against MacDonald of Lochalsh and treachery which led to the execution of the chief of the Clan MacDonald of Dunnyveg and his son eventually led to the death of John MacIain at the hands of his avenging kinsmen in 1518.

The 8th chief of the MacDonalds or MacIains of Ardnamurchan led his clan in support of the Clan Macdonald of Clanranald against the Clan Fraser of Lovat in the Battle of the Shirts in 1544. It is said that only eight MacDonalds and five Frasers survived.

17th Century

By 1618 the MacDonalds or MacIains of Ardnamurchan had lost their lands through duplicity of the Clan Campbell. The fortunes of the clan declined and they were forced to go elsewhere. Many settled in Moidart under the Clan Macdonald of Clanranald whilst others migrated east to Badenoch.

Castles

Mingary Castle, is located to the east of Kilchoan, on the Ardnamurchan peninsula, dates from the thirteenth century and was built by the MacIains or MacIans of Ardnamurchan. James IV of Scotland occupied the castle in 1493 and 1495 during his campaigns against the MacDonalds. The castle was captured by the chief of the Clan MacLean in the 1550s and the chief of Clan MacIan of Ardnamurchan laid siege to the castle with Spanish soldiers from an Armada in Tobermory Bay.
Dunyvaig Castle, on the Isle of Islay, Argyll was originally held by the MacDonalds but was given to the MacIans of Ardnamurchan at the end of the fifteenth century. The property was later leased back to the MacDonalds and then passed to the Campbells.

Clan Septs

Septs of Clan MacDonald of Ardnamurchan include the following. Other branches of the Clan MacDonald have different septs.
Johnston (Isle of Coll)
Johnson 
Kean
Keene

See also

Clan Donald
Scottish clan

Notes

External links
 http://www.clandonald-heritage.com
http://www.electricscotland.com/webclans/m/macdonald/addinfojpw.htm

Clan Donald
MacDonald of Ardnamurchan, Clan
Ardnamurchan